The Lamborghini V8 is a ninety degree (90°) V8 petrol engine designed by Lamborghini in the 1970s for their less-expensive vehicles.  It was only the second internal combustion engine ever developed by the company, and first saw production for the 1971 Lamborghini Urraco.  It was designed by Gian Paolo Dallara.  The all-aluminium alloy engine was introduced as a 2.5-litre variant, displacing , but was expanded, by increasing the piston stroke to a 3.0-litre variant for 1975 - now displacing .

A 2.0-litre reduced-stroke version was also introduced in 1975 for sale in Italy, displacing , because of Italian legislation which imposed punitive taxes on cars whose engines displaced more than 2.0 litres.

This V8 engine was also used in two other models, the Lamborghini Silhouette in 1976–1977 in which it kept the 3.0-litre displacement, and the slightly updated replacement in 1982, the Lamborghini Jalpa, which saw the engine increased in size to 3.5 litres, displacing , for ease in meeting ever-tighter emissions requirements.

Specifications
engine configuration 90° V8 engine; wet sump lubrication system
engine displacement etc.
cylinder block and crankcase cast aluminium alloy
cylinder heads and valvetrain
2.0/2.5: cast aluminium alloy, two valves per cylinder, 16 valves total, belt driven single overhead camshafts
3.0/3.5: cast aluminium alloy, two valves per cylinder, 16 valves total, chain driven double overhead camshafts
aspiration Naturally aspirated
fuel system 2.0: 4 twin-barrel down-draught Weber 40 IDF 1 carburettors
 2.5: 4 twin-barrel down-draught Weber 40 IDF 1 or Solex C40P117 carburettors
 3.0: 4 twin-barrel down-draught Weber 40 DCNF carburetors
 3.5: 4 twin-barrel down-draught Weber 42 DCNF carburetors
ignition system and engine management 2 Magnetti Marelli coils and 1 Marelli Distributor S127E
exhaust system ????
2.0 rated motive power & torque outputs and applications  @ 7,800 rpm; — Lamborghini Urraco
2.5 rated motive power & torque outputs and applications
  @ 7,500 rpm; — Lamborghini Urraco
3.0 rated motive power & torque outputs and applications  @ 5,750 rpm
  @ 7,500 rpm; — Lamborghini Urraco
  @ 7,500 rpm; — Lamborghini Silhouette
  @ 7,800 rpm; — Lamborghini Urraco
3.5 rated motive power & torque outputs and applications  @ 7,000 rpm; — Lamborghini Jalpa

References

External links
Lamborghini.com official website

V 8
Gasoline engines by model
V8 engines